Emesaya is a genus of true bug in the subfamily Emesinae.

Partial species list
Emesaya brevipennis

References

External links
Reduviidae - Assassin bugs -- Discover Life

Reduviidae